Pterostylis aneba is a species of orchid endemic to south-eastern Australia. It is a recently described and poorly-known greenhood similar to Pterostylis alpina and P. monticola. It has a rosette of fleshy leaves at the base of the plant and a single green and white flower. It grows in alpine and sub-alpine habitats.

Description
Pterostylis aneba is a terrestrial, perennial, deciduous, herb with an underground tuber and a rosette of three to five egg-shaped leaves surrounding the base of the flowering stem. The dorsal sepal and petals are fused, forming a hood or "galea" over the column. The dorsal sepal is the same length as the petals and curves forward with a pointed tip. There is a gap between the galea and the lateral sepals. The lateral sepals are erect and have thread-like tips 15–20 mm long and a slightly bulging V-shaped sinus between them. Flowering occurs from December to February.

Taxonomy and naming
Pterostylis aneba was first formally described in 2006 by David Jones and the description was published in Australian Orchid Research from a specimen collected at Packers Swamp, west of Bemboka.

Distribution and habitat
This greenhood grows in moist grassy areas in montane forest and near streams in southern New South Wales and north-eastern Victoria.

References

aneba
Endemic orchids of Australia
Orchids of New South Wales
Orchids of Victoria (Australia)
Plants described in 2006